Rachel Tallent (born 20 February 1993) is a female racewalker from Australia. She competed in the Women's 20 kilometres walk event at the 2015 World Championships in Athletics in Beijing, China. She also competed in the 2016 Olympics, while racing with a stress reaction in her left femur.  She is the sister of Olympic Champion Jared Tallent who was previously her coach.

See also
 Australia at the 2015 World Championships in Athletics

References

External links

Australian female racewalkers
Living people
Place of birth missing (living people)
1993 births
World Athletics Championships athletes for Australia
Olympic athletes of Australia
Athletes (track and field) at the 2016 Summer Olympics
Universiade medalists in athletics (track and field)
Universiade bronze medalists for Australia
Medalists at the 2015 Summer Universiade
20th-century Australian women
21st-century Australian women